Nina Wilcox Putnam (November 28, 1888March 8, 1962) was an American novelist, screenwriter and playwright. She wrote more than 500 short stories, around 1000 magazine articles, and several books in addition to regular newspaper columns, serials, comic books and children's literature. Many of her stories were made into films, including a story that was the basis for the 1932 film The Mummy starring Boris Karloff. She married four times, was estimated to have earned one million dollars from her writing, and drafted the first 1040 income tax form for the IRS.

Biography

Inez Coralie Wilcox was born in New Haven, Connecticut on November 28, 1888 to Eleanor Sanchez Wilcox and Marrion Wilcox. She was homeschooled by her father, who taught English at Yale and was an editor of Harper's Weekly and the Encyclopedia Americana. She had a sister, Lenor, who was five years younger than she. When Inez was 11 years old, the New York Sunday Herald bought a short story of hers for $5.

Wilcox took a job making hats at a Fifth avenue millinery. She married publisher Robert Faulkner Putnam in 1907, taking his last name. She drafted the first US Income Tax 1040 form for the Internal Revenue Service in 1912. She was diagnosed with tuberculosis and given two years to live, an experience she wrote about in 1922 in the Saturday Evening Post.

Putnam was a prolific writer, penning romances, westerns, musical comedies and Gothic horror. She wrote pieces for The Saturday Evening Post and had a syndicated column called "I and George" that was carried in 400 newspapers. She also wrote children's books and created a comic book series for children called Sunny Bunny. In 1928 or 1929 she began the comic strip Witty Kitty. Putnam was also a vocal advocate for Victorian dress reform, decrying the horrors of corsets and experimenting with her own dress designs.

A 1929 video of Nina Wilcox Putnam is archived at the University of South Carolina Libraries. In the video Nina Wilcox Putnam tells jokes and sends greetings from France. Putnam walks from bench in garden to table where secretary is working, writes some jokes.

The screenplay for the 1932 film The Mummy starring Boris Karloff was adapted from an original story by Putnam and Richard Schayer. The pair learned about Alessandro Cagliostro and wrote a nine-page treatment entitled Cagliostro. The original story, set in San Francisco, was about a 3000-year-old magician who survives by injecting nitrates. Screenwriter John L. Balderston based his script on the story.

Hollywood made several of Putnam's stories into movies, including Graft, A Game Chicken (1922), The Fourth Horseman, In Search of Arcady, Sitting Pretty, Slaves of Beauty, Two Weeks With Pay, The Beauty Prize, A Lady's Profession (1933) and Golden Harvest. She wrote the screenplay for Democracy: The Vision Restored (1920) and the 1953 film El billetero was adapted from her story. She was estimated to have earned one million dollars from her writing by 1942.

She was the Chairwoman of the Palm Beach County Finnish Relief Fund and she wrote tracts for the Woman's Christian Temperance Union.

Putnam moved to a resort community in Cuernavaca, Mexico, around 1946. After a long illness, the last six years of which she was confined to bed, Putnam died on March 8, 1962.

Personal life
Wilcox married New York publisher Robert Faulkner Putnam on October 5, 1907, in New York City. They had a son, John Francis Putnam. Robert Putnam died on October 23, 1918, a victim of that year's flu pandemic. She kept the name Putnam for the rest of her life.

In 1919 she married Robert J. Sanderson of Boston. In 1924, the wife of Putnam's chauffeur-secretary, Richard Ellsworth Bassett, alleged that Putnam had tried to convince her to divorce her husband so that Putnam could marry him. Putnam, who had been pursuing a divorce from Sanderson, denied the charges. She divorced Sanderson in 1926. Her third marriage was to Arthur James Ogle on September 12, 1931, in Yuma, Arizona. In July 1933 she was granted a divorce from Ogle. The day after her divorce, Putnam married Christian Eliot, nephew of Granville John Eliot, 7th Earl of St Germans. Christian died on June 18, 1948.

She had homes in New York, Hollywood and Delray Beach, Florida, and once purchased a castle in Spain.

Bibliography

References

Further reading
Nina Wilcox Putnam Papers Yale Collection of American Literature, Beinecke Rare Book and Manuscript Library.

External links
 
 
 

1888 births
1962 deaths
20th-century American novelists
American accountants
Women accountants
American children's writers
American women novelists
Writers from New Haven, Connecticut
Writers from Providence, Rhode Island
American women dramatists and playwrights
American women essayists
American women screenwriters
People from Delray Beach, Florida
Women in finance
Internal Revenue Service people
American women children's writers
20th-century American women writers
20th-century American dramatists and playwrights
20th-century American essayists
Novelists from Connecticut
Screenwriters from Florida
Screenwriters from Connecticut
Screenwriters from Rhode Island
20th-century American screenwriters
American expatriates in Mexico